USCGC Ocracoke (WPB-1307) is an Island Class Cutter of the United States Coast Guard.
She is homeported in Maine, where she patrols international and territorial waters as a humanitarian, law enforcement, and Homeland Security asset. Her primary missions are Search and Rescue, Counter-Smuggling Activities, and Homeland Security.

Upon commissioning in 1986 and until 1991, she was assigned to Coast Guard Patrol Boat Squadron Two (CG PATBOATRON TWO) in Roosevelt Roads, Puerto Rico. During this period she conducted law enforcement, search and rescue, and expeditionary naval operations. When CG PATBOATRON TWO was decommissioned on July 1, 1991 she was assigned to Commander, Greater Antilles Section.

As of 2014 she was working out of Portland, Maine.

On March 31, 2015, together with other USCG elements, she assisted the distressed Canadian sailing ship Liana's Ransom, when she lost engine power during a storm off Gloucester, Massachusetts.
On Nov 22, 2019, Ocracoke was decommissioned at a ceremony held in South Portland, ME.

Design
The Island-class patrol boats were constructed in Bollinger Shipyards, Lockport, Louisiana. It is powered two Paxman Valenta 16 CM diesel engines or two Caterpillar 3516 diesel engines. It has two  3304T diesel generators made by Caterpillar; these can serve as motor–generators. Its hull is constructed from highly strong steel, and the superstructure and major deck are constructed from aluminium.

It is fitted with one  machine gun and two  M60 light machine guns; it may also be fitted with two Browning .50 Caliber Machine Guns. It is fitted with satellite navigation systems, collision avoidance systems, surface radar, and a Loran C system. Its complement is sixteen (two officers and fourteen crew members). Island-class patrol boats are based on Vosper Thornycroft  patrol boats and have similar dimensions.

References

Ships of the United States Coast Guard
Island-class patrol boats
1986 ships
Ships built in Lockport, Louisiana